Issa Mohamed can refer to:

 Issa Mohamed (cyclist) (born 1965), Emirati cyclist
 Issa Mohamed (swimmer) (born 1995), Kenyan swimmer